Perth Princes Street railway station served the city of Perth, Perth and Kinross, Scotland, from 1847 to 1966 on the Dundee and Perth Railway.

History 

The station, which was located on Princes Street near the eastern end of South William Street, opened on 24 May 1847 by the Dundee and Perth Railway. To the south was the goods yard and to the east was the signal box. To the west was an engine shed, although it was removed early in the station's lifespan. The station temporarily closed as a wartime economy measure on 1 January 1917 and reopened on 1 June 1919. The signal box closed around 1921. The station closed permanently on 28 February 1966.

The Moncreiffe Arms Hotel stood adjacent to the station. A 1907 advertisement listed the proprietor as A. L. Kennedy.

The image at left was taken around two years after the station's closure.

References

External links 

Disused railway stations in Perth and Kinross
Railway stations in Great Britain opened in 1847
Railway stations in Great Britain closed in 1917
Railway stations in Great Britain opened in 1919
Railway stations in Great Britain closed in 1966
Beeching closures in Scotland
Former Caledonian Railway stations
1847 establishments in Scotland
1966 disestablishments in Scotland
Railway stations in Perth, Scotland